Megaloolithus is an oogenus of dinosaur egg. Some eggs belonging to this oogenus may have been laid by the titanosaur Hypselosaurus. They are primarily found in India and Europe, but some specimens have been found in South America.

Species

 M. aureliensis
 M. baghensis
 M. cylindricus
 M. dhoridungriensis 
 M. jabalpurensis 
 M. khempurensis 
 M. mamillare 
 M. megadermus 
 M. microtuberculata 
 M. mohabeyi
 M. petralta
 M. problematica
 M. siruguei
 M. trempii
 M. patagonicus

Distribution
Fossils of Megaloolithus have been found in:
 Anacleto Formation - Argentina
 Argiles et Grés à Reptiles, Rognacian, Marnes Rouges Inférieures & Marnes Rouges de Roquelongue Formation - France
 Lameta Formation - India
 Sânpetru Formation - Romania
 Figuerola, La Maçana & Tremp Formations - Spain

Gallery

See also 

 List of dinosaur oogenera

References

Further reading
  
 

Dinosaur reproduction
Egg fossils
Cretaceous Argentina
Fossils of Argentina
Anacleto Formation
Cretaceous France
Fossils of France
Cretaceous India
Fossils of India
Cretaceous Romania
Fossils of Romania
Cretaceous Spain
Fossils of Spain
Tremp Formation
Fossil parataxa described in 1991